The 1906 North Kilkenny by-election was held on 3 March 1906 after Joseph Devlin resigned.  Devlin had been elected for the Irish Parliamentary Party in the 1906 general election for both North Kilkenny and West Belfast.  As he could only take one seat he chose West Belfast, so creating a vacancy.

The seat was retained by Michael Meagher who stood for the Irish Parliamentary Party.  The by-election was uncontested.

References

1906 elections in the United Kingdom
By-elections to the Parliament of the United Kingdom in County Kilkenny constituencies
1906 elections in Ireland